The Sainte-Marguerite River (Saint Margaret River) is a  long river in the Côte-Nord region of Quebec, Canada. 
It flows into the Gulf of Saint Lawrence to the west of Sept-Îles.
There are traces of human activity along the river from 4,000 years ago.
Pulp and paper exploitation in the river basin began in the early 20th century, followed by mining.

Course

The Sainte-Marguerite River is in the middle Côte-Nord, between Baie-Comeau and Havre-Saint-Pierre.
It lies between the basins of the Dominique River to the west and the Rapides River to the east.
The river originates in the northeast of the canton of Hind.
It rises to the northeast of the Petit lac Manicouagan.
From near the border with Labrador, the river flows first through a mountainous region, and then for more than  through a coastal plain.
Much of the southern part of the river basin, up to the Réservoir Sainte-Marguerite 3, is part of the Zec Matimek.

It grew up around the hydroelectric plant built in 1908 by the Clarke brothers on the site of the Amont Falls.
Highway 138 crosses the dam.

Its mouth is to the southwest of the Baie des Sept-Îles.
During the Holocene the Sainte-Marguerite created a delta of thick paraglacial and post-glacial sediments that completely cover the glacial landforms and glaciomarine deposits near the river mouth.

The river mouth today is a haven for small boats during bad weather in the Gulf, because the basin that it forms is protected by the Pointe Sainte-Marguerite.
However, the channel of the river through the basin varies from year to year.
The village of Rivière-Sainte-Marguerite-en-Bas is on the west bank of the mouth.

Name

The name was used as early as 1603, when Samuel de Champlain wrote, "we came to anchor near a river called Saincte Marguerite". 
There is another large river with this name in Quebec, the Sainte-Marguerite River (Saguenay), an  tributary of the Saguenay River. 
Other names include Tshimanipishtuk River and Tshishe-Manipishtuk.

Environment

A map of the Ecological regions of Quebec shows the river rising and flowing south through the eastern spruce/moss domain of the boreal zone.
The last section of the river flows through the fir/white birch domain of the boreal zone.

Archaeology

The project was managed in 1991–1998 by  Cérane (Centre d’étude et de recherche en archéologie du Nord-Est).
67 sites were found, of which 12 were explored and one was studied intensively.

Over a stretch of  this section has a series of waterfalls and impassible rapids.
The portage to bypass these obstacles could take a week.
There are indications that people have used the portage for 4,000 years.
There seem to have been different groups of people in the Sainte-Marguerite valley, separated by the Grand Portage.
The people to the south were associated with the world of the Saint Lawrence coast, while those to the north were more associated with the large interior lakes.
The oldest known site on the Sainte-Marguerite is found on the portage, a temporary halt where hunters took the time to cut or sharpen spear points about 4,000 years ago.
Another site along the Grand Portage is on the north shore of Lac Jourdain (map), containing 11 structures with 61 stone tools and over 7,000 shards.

A site on the upper river dating to between 600 and 1000 years ago indicates that the occupants caught fish and smoked their catch there.
The site seems to have been occupied only occasionally, and only by men rather than by families.
A prehistoric site of about  has been identified on the flat right shore of the Rivière Jean-Pierre, at the extreme northeast of the SM-3 reservoir.
Excavation of a small part of the site has found 35 stone tools, 383 splinters and six or seven fireplaces.
There were 21 types of stone in the assembly, indicating that the occupants were in contact with groups to their west, northwest and north.

Hydroelectricity

Clarke City

The brothers George, James, John and William Clarke, of New York and Toronto, were editors of the Century Dictionary and the Encyclopædia Britannica
They visited the region at the end of the 19th century on a fishing expedition, at a time when only a few hunters and fishermen lived in the area.
They returned early in the 20th century to investigate the potential for wood to supply paper for their publications.
They found plentiful trees and a powerful river to supply power.

The Clarke brothers built a paper mill  from the mouth of the river between 1903 and 1908, and in 1908 inaugurated the first hydroelectric plant to supply electricity to the mill and to the nearby Clarke City.
They also built a  railway to link the paper mill to Pointe-Noire, where they built a wharf. 
The train was owned by the North Shore Power Railway & Navigation Company, founded by the Clarke Brothers in 1902. 
The company was renamed the Gulf Pulp and Paper Co in 1914.
It was bought out by British investors in 1920.
The mill continued in operation until 1967.
In 1968 Gulf Pulp and Paper sold the present dam to the Iron Ore Company (IOC).

Sainte-Marguerite-1

Sainte-Marguerite-1 (SM-1) is located beside Clarke City.
The present structure is a 30.5 MW hydroelectric facility owned by Innergex.
It was commissioned in 1993 with one turbine, which supplied 8.5 MW.
In 2002 two more turbines were added, bringing the plant up to its present capacity.
The SM-IA expansion was commissioned in June 2002, adding two fully regulated 11 MW vertical Kaplan turbines to the existing Francis turbine.
The plant was acquired by Innergex (50.1%) and Desjardins Group Pension Plan (49.99%) in 2014, and delivers power under contract to Hydro Quebec.
Average annual output is 166,500 MWh.

Sainte-Marguerite-2
It was built in 1951.
SM-2 is owned by Gulf Power, a subsidiary of IOC (now Rio Tinto). 
It was built for Gulf Pulp and Paper, and was commissioned in 1954. 
It produces 17.6 MW. 
Electricity was sent to Sept-Iles for IOC to process iron ore from Schefferville, and some was sold to the Sept-Îles Electricity Cooperative.

Sainte-Marguerite-3
The Sainte-Marguerite-3 hydroelectric power station has a capacity of 882 MW.
The reservoir induced some minor earthquakes.
Another side effect, which had been anticipated, was a rise in mercury levels by factors of 6 to 8 in lake whitefish (Coregonus clupeaformis) and northern pike (Esox lucius), the main species of fish in the reservoir. Brook trout (Salvelinus fontinalis''), the preferred fish for the local people, tend to avoid large reservoirs and were not affected.
Mercury exposure to consumers stayed well below accepted levels.

Lakes

Notes

Sources

External links

Rivers of Côte-Nord